Witiko is a historical novel by Austrian writer Adalbert Stifter about the founding of the Kingdom of Bohemia in the 12th-century. Published in several volumes from 1865 to 1867, Witiko takes its name from its protagonist, the knight Witiko of Prčice, father of the Vítkovci dynasty. His descendants would come to play such an important role at the Prague royal court that they were called "the real lords of the kingdom."

Plot

References

External links
Witiko digitized at archive.org (in German)

Novels by Adalbert Stifter
1865 novels
Novels set in the 12th century
Historical novels
German historical novels
12th century in Bohemia